Zamboanga del Norte (Cebuano: Amihanang Zamboanga; Subanon: Utara Sembwangan), officially the Province of Zamboanga del Norte, is a province in the Philippines situated within the Zamboanga Peninsula region in Mindanao. Its capital is Dipolog and the province borders Zamboanga del Sur and Zamboanga Sibugay to the south, Misamis Occidental to the east, and the Sulu Sea to the west.

Zamboanga del Norte is the largest province of the Zamboanga Peninsula region by land area covering . Zamboanga del Norte is the 26th populous province in the Philippines.

History

Early history 

Prior to its creation as a province, Zamboanga del Norte formed the northern portion of the historical province of Zamboanga.

The early history of Zamboanga del Norte is shared with that of Zamboanga City, which had been the center of the entire Mindanao area, most notably during the American era. When Zamboanga City became a chartered city on October 12, 1936, it encompassed the southern tip of the Zamboanga Peninsula and the island of Basilan, making it the largest city in the world in terms of land area.

Creation as a Province 
Through Republic Act No. 711 issued on June 6, 1952, Zamboanga province was divided into two independent provinces, which included Zamboanga del Sur.

Martial law era

Zamboanga del Norte was the site of at least one major assassination during the Marcos Martial law era - the gunning down of Human Rights lawyers Jacobo Amatong and Zorro Aguilar by two soldiers of the Marcos government, who were never caught. Both lawyers have since been honored by having their names inscribed on the wall of remembrance at the Philippines’ Bantayog ng mga Bayani, which honors the heroes and martyrs who fought against Ferdinand Marcos and his martial law regime.

Proposed carving out of new province 
In 2017, House Bill No. 5040 was introduced in the House of Representatives seeking to carve out a new province from Zamboanga del Norte. The proposed Zamboanga Hermosa province was to consist of 12 municipalities and 2 legislative districts that make up the 3rd legislative district of Zamboanga del Norte: Baliguian, Godod, Gutalac, Kalawit, Labason, Leon B. Postigo, Liloy (its proposed capital), Salug, Sibuco, Siocon, Sirawai, and Tampilisan. However, the bill ultimately did not pass the 17th congress.

Geography

Zamboanga del Norte covers a total area of  occupying the northern portion of the Zamboanga Peninsula in western Mindanao. The province is bordered on the north and west by the Sulu Sea, on the northeast by Misamis Occidental, and on the south by Zamboanga del Sur and Zamboanga Sibugay.

Other parts, near the coastlines, are plains.

Climate
Zamboanga del Norte has a mild and moderate climate due to evenly distributed rainfall throughout the year. Its southern portion has a longer dry season.

Administrative divisions

Zamboanga del Norte comprises 25 municipalities and 2 cities. Dipolog, Sindangan and Dapitan are the top most densely populated area in the province These are further subdivided into 691 barangays, and clustered into 3 congressional districts.

Sibuco is the largest municipality by land area, constituting  of the total provincial area.

Demographics

Dipolog is the most populated locality in the province, followed by the town of Sindangan and city of Dapitan.

The main language spoken is Cebuano. Other languages include Chavacano, Subanon, Tagalog, and English.

Religion
The predominant religion was Islam until the Spanish regime took over the region and spread Christianity with the help of the church's mission orders like the Jesuits, Augustinians, and Dominicans. The province's first martyr of faith, soon to be raised as a saint, in Mindanao island was Padre Francesco Palliola, S.J. He was a Jesuit missionary from Nola, Italy, and was assigned to Zamboanga Peninsula. He was active as a missionary in Lubungan (Katipuan), Zamboanga del Norte, Iligan, Dapitan, and met his martyrdom at the barrio of Ponot, now a town of Jose Dalman. Roman Catholicism is a significant majority with about 50% adherence. The province has one diocese – the Roman Catholic Diocese of Dipolog under the Archdiocese of Ozamiz, covering the entire province. There are also followers of other Christian sects.

Government

Officials

These are the officials after the local elections of 2022:

Governor: Rosalina "Nene" G. Jalosjos (Nacionalista)

Vice Governor: Julius C. Napigquit (PDP–Laban)

Members of the House of Representatives:

 1st District: Rep. Romeo "Jon-jon" M. Jalosjos, Jr. (Nacionalista/APP/HNP)
 2nd District: Rep. Glona G. Labadlabad (PDP–Laban)
 3rd District: Rep. Adrian Michael "Ian" A. Amatong (LP)

Board Members

 1st District:
 Angelica "Angel" Jalosjos Carreon
 Patri "Jing" Bajamunde - Chan

 2nd District:
 Peter Y. Co
 Jasmin N. Pinsoy-Lagutin
 Dante G. Bagarinao
 Michael "Jojo" M. Documento, Jr.

 3rd Drstrict:
 Kay Marie P. Bolando
 Leo Nicanor B. Mejorada
 Franco Angelo "Conkee" C. Buctuan
 Jeff Raymund "JR" M. Brillantes

Economy

About half of the province's land area is devoted to agriculture. Corn, coconut, and rice are the major crops. The province being rich in marine and mineral sources, its fish production has accelerated through the development of fishponds. Commercial fishing has steadily increased through the years, with the yellow fin tuna as the primary species.

In 2006, a study by National Statistics Coordination Board (NSCB), found Zamboanga del Norte Province to be the Philippines' poorest province with a poverty incidence rate of 64.6%, an increase from 47% in year 2000 statistical figures.

As of 2015, the province's poverty incidence has dropped to 51.6% (ranking 8th). Large foreign mining companies operating within the province such as Canadian company TVI Resource Development and Philex Mining Corp. cause adverse effects to the culture and traditions of the indigenous Subanon and other poor settlers.

References

External links

 
 
 Old website of the Province of Zamboanga del Norte
 Daily Zamboanga Times

 
Provinces of the Philippines
Provinces of Zamboanga Peninsula
Zamboanga Peninsula
States and territories established in 1952
1952 establishments in the Philippines